Judo was one of the many sports which was held at the 1997 West Asian Games in Tehran, Iran between 27 and 28 November 1997. The competition took place at the Heidarnia Hall.

Medalists

Medal table

References

Medalists

External links
Official website

Asian Games, West
1997 West Asian Games